Suy Sem  (born 25 August 1947) is a Cambodian politician and Minister of Mines and Energy. He is a member of the Cambodian People's Party and was elected to represent Pursat Province in the National Assembly of Cambodia in 2003. He was reinstated as the Minister of Mines and Energy after the general elections in 2013. Before 2013, he served as Minister of Industry, Mines, and Energy which was split into two ministries: Ministry of Mines and Energy, and Ministry of Industry and Handicrafts.

References

1947 births 
Members of the National Assembly (Cambodia)
Living people
Government ministers of Cambodia 
Cambodian People's Party politicians
Cambodian people of Chinese descent 
People from Phnom Penh